The Arboretum is a city park in Nottingham, England.

The Arboretum was the first designated public park in Nottingham, selected under the authority of the Inclosure Act 1845. The botanist and horticultural publisher, Samuel Curtis, oversaw the design of the park. The park officially opened on 11 May 1852. In 1986 it was Grade II* listed with Historic England.

The Arboretum is a Green Flag Award-winning park that contains more than 800 trees belonging to 65 species.

History

The arboretum was the first designated public park in Nottingham, it was selected for this purpose under the authority of the British government's Inclosure Act in 1845. The botanist and horticultural publisher, Samuel Curtis (1779–1860), oversaw the design of the park, which opened on 11 May 1852. The park was opened by the Mayor of Nottingham, the lace manufacturer Mr W Felkin, and the Sheriff of the Borough of Nottingham, a Mr Ball, in front of a crowd of 30,000 people.

The park was designed as a botanical collection, and as a tranquil place in which to relax, forming a major attraction in the heart of Victorian Nottingham. From 1852 it was open free of charge on Sunday, Monday and Wednesday, but was 6d admission on other days, or £1 for a yearly permit.

Refreshment rooms built in the Tudor style were opened in 1852 to the designs of Henry Moses Wood by James Ebrank Hall, builder, with a banqueting hall occupying the entire frontage. The building also comprised a Ladies’ room, Refectory and Kitchen. An entrance hall and staircase led to three chambers upstairs. The whole building was constructed of brick with stone facings and was castellated along the front. The wings of the refreshment rooms were demolished in 1932. The remainder of the building traded as a hotel and restaurant and as a pub as The Arboretum Rooms, The Arboretum pub (also known as The pub in the Park), Arboretum Hotel and Arboretum Manor. In 1965 the building was severely damaged by fire and had to be almost completely rebuilt. In 2006, another fire resulted in its demolition.

The Circular Aviary was opened in 1889 with the original cast-iron uprights and roof struts covered with modern steel mesh. The Main Aviary of brick was constructed in 1955/6. The Upper Aviary was built in 1934 to house tropical birds.

The first bandstand was moved here from the green in Nottingham Castle in 1881 and placed in front of the Refreshment Rooms. The bandstand was replaced in 1907 with a new one designed by Frank Beckett Lewis the City Architect.

English Heritage has designated the site Grade II* status on the Register of Historic Parks & Gardens and the park's Bell Tower, bandstand and Circular Aviary have all received Grade II listing protection.

Arboretum was the name of a ward in the City of Nottingham until 2019, when it was merged with the Hyson Green ward to form the Hyson Green and Arboretum ward. At the time of the 2011 census, the former Arboretum ward had a population of 13,321.

Facilities and events
There is an Aviary built in 1889 that is Grade II listed, and a bandstand built in 1907 by Frank Beckett Lewis that is also Grade II listed.

There have been many functions held at The Arboretum including the annual Nottingham Pride festival.

Listed buildings within the Arboretum

Gateway, Screen Walls, and Railings at South West Entrance to Arboretum, 1851-52 by Henry Moses Wood Grade II listed.
Lodge at South West Entrance to Arboretum, 1851–52 by Henry Moses Wood Grade II listed
Lodge, Gate and Screen Walls at East Entrance to Arboretum, 1851–52 designed by Henry Moses Wood and constructed by East and Hill. Grade II listed
Memorial to Samuel Morley (MP) 1920 by Joseph Else Grade II listed.
Pedestrian Subway, Railings and Walls on East Side of Arboretum, 1851–52 by Henry Moses Wood Grade II listed.
Statue of Feargus O'Connor on South Side of Arboretum, 1859 by JB Robinson of Derby Grade II listed
War Memorial to the 59th (2nd Nottinghamshire) Regiment of Foot on South Side of Arboretum, 1862-63 by Marriott Ogle Tarbotton Grade II listed. The cupola contained a bell which was looted by British troops from a temple in Canton during the Second Opium War. This was removed to the regimental museum in 1956. Two cannon were captured at Sebastopol in 1854-55 during the Crimean War and the other two are replicas.

References

External links
 Nottingham Arboretum park information by Nottingham City Council
 Hyson Green and Arboretum ward information by Nottingham City Council

Arboretum
Tourist attractions in Nottinghamshire
Gardens in Nottinghamshire
Nottingham
Parks and open spaces in Nottinghamshire
Nottingham
Grade II* listed parks and gardens in Nottinghamshire